Christopher Blizzard is a Developer Relations lead at Facebook. Formerly, he worked as an Open Source Evangelist at the Mozilla Corporation and has contributed to other open source projects, including Red Hat and One Laptop Per Child.

Prior to his position as Open Source Evangelist he was the Software Team Lead for the One Laptop Per Child project at Red Hat and sat on the Mozilla Corporation Board of Directors. Before joining the One Laptop Per Child project he was a Systems Engineer and Open Source software developer working at Red Hat.

One Laptop Per Child
Blizzard was the OLPC Software Team Lead through Red Hat. He helped to develop the project's modified version of Fedora Core Linux. He handled all integration and community work with the OLPC project and unveiled the laptop in a video on Friday, June 2, 2006. Chris was also involved with the development of the OLPC's Sugar interface.

References

Year of birth missing (living people)
Living people
American computer scientists
Computer systems engineers
Silicon Valley people
People from Mountain View, California
Mozilla developers
Open source people
Free software programmers
Mozilla people